The Ljubljana Castle Funicular is a funicular railway in Ljubljana, the capital of Slovenia. It goes from Krek Square near the Ljubljana Central Market to the Ljubljana Castle. The idea of having a funicular going to the castle dates back to 1897, when then mayor Ivan Hribar wrote to the Austro-Hungarian authorities asking for a lift that would go up to the castle. It was realised on 28 December 2006. The funicular is popular among tourists. It runs between the hours of 10:00 and 21:00 in wintertime, and the hours of 10:00 and 22:00 in summertime, and the full trip lasts 60 seconds.

Gallery

See also 
 List of funicular railways

References

Funicular railways in Slovenia
Castle funicular